Reyes Demar Uriah Cleary (born 13 April 2004) is an English professional footballer who currently plays as a forward for EFL Championship club West Bromwich Albion.

Career
Cleary progressed through West Bromwich Albion's academy, and began training with the club's first team in the 2021–22 season after impressive form for the club's under-18 and under-23 teams. He was offered a professional contract by the club in December 2021. He was nominated for the Premier League 2 player of the month award for December 2021. He made his senior debut as a substitute in a 2–1 FA Cup defeat to Brighton & Hove Albion on 8 January 2022.

References

External links

2004 births
Living people
English footballers
English sportspeople of Jamaican descent
Association football forwards
West Bromwich Albion F.C. players
English Football League players